Virtual Desktop is a computer application that displays the user's computer monitor in a three-dimensional virtual space, for use with a virtual reality headset. At the time of its release, CNET and Polygon wrote that the software was essential for virtual reality headset owners.

In May, 2019, the application was released for the Oculus Quest with the ability to wirelessly stream a user's computer monitor to the headset. Godin later added an additional feature to stream VR games, Facebook forced the developer to remove the update citing that its "stream quality wasn’t reliable enough for Quest owners". An unofficial patch was released outside of the Quest store. However in February 2021, while submitting a version with the feature for inclusion on the less-restrictive Oculus App Lab store, the company unexpectedly backpedaled and approved the feature in the Quest store version of Virtual Desktop.

References

External links 

 

2016 software
Virtual reality